Miss Earth India or Miss India Earth is a title given to the Indian woman who represents India at Miss Earth, an annual, international beauty pageant promoting environmental awareness. The current national pageant which chooses the Indian representative for Miss Earth is Miss Divine Beauty of India.

History

2001–2014: Femina Miss India and Miss Diva
India has participated in the Miss Earth pageant since its inception in 2001. From 2001 to 2013, India's representatives at Miss Earth were selected by Femina Miss India (a beauty pageant founded in 1964). Femina Miss India is sponsored by Femina, a women's magazine published by the Times Group.

From 2002, the third winner of Femina Miss India was changed from Miss India Asia Pacific International to Femina Miss India-Earth to designate India's representative to the new Miss Earth pageant, and a finalist was sent to Miss International. From 2007 to 2009, three winners went to Miss Universe, Miss World, and Miss Earth. In 2010, I Am She - Miss Universe India acquired the rights to send India's representatives to the Miss Universe pageant. The first winner at Femina Miss India was designated to participate in Miss World, the second winner to Miss Earth, and the third winner to Miss International. In 2013, the Times Group regained the rights to send India's representatives to Miss Universe and launched a new pageant for Miss Universe (Miss Diva). The following year, Miss Earth India received the second title at the Miss Diva pageant.

India did well at the Miss Earth debut in 2001, when Shamita Singha was one of the Top 10 finalists. The country has become a strong contender for Miss Earth; Jyoti Brahmin of West Bengal and Shriya Kishore of Maharashtra made the Top 16 in 2004 and 2009, respectively (both years were won by Brazil). In 2006 and 2007, Amruta Patki and Pooja Chitgopekar were Miss Air (first runners-up).

In 2010, Nicole Faria won the Miss Earth crown for India. In addition to the main title, Faria was chosen as Miss Talent (the 10th pageant's first special award). She performed a belly dance combining Oriental and Middle Eastern styles in a performance which raised ₫100 million, which was donated to the Ho Chi Minh City Red Cross to aid flood victims in central Vietnam. As a Miss Earth winner, Faria addressed the problems of Bangalore's lakes. The lakes have rapidly disappeared in the past 30 years (from 270-300 lakes to about 80) due to industrial development. The remaining 80 lakes have been severely polluted by human and industrial waste.

In 2014, Femina Miss India's sister pageant (Miss Diva) sent India's representative to Miss Earth. The Miss Diva pageant, established in 2013, is also owned by the Times Group. The titleholder, Alankrita Sahai won on 14 October 2014.

2015: Glamanand Supermodel India
Glamanand Supermodel India Beauty Pageant chairman Nikhil Anand acquired the rights to send India's delegates to the Miss Earth pageant in 2015, and the winner of the Glamanand Supermodel India 2015 contest was crowned Miss Earth India. In 2016, Glamanand lost the rights.

2016: Cheryl Hansen
In 2016, the Miss Earth franchise of was obtained by Cheryl Hansen. The audition had 37 finalists from Bangalore and New Delhi screenings.

2018: Glamanand Supermodel India
Glamanand Supermodel India sent India's representative to Miss Earth 2018, which was held in the Philippines.

2019 - present: Miss Divine Beauty
Miss Divine Beauty Pageant acquired the rights to send India's delegates to the Miss Earth pageant in 2019, and one of the winner of the contest "Tejaswini Manogna" was crowned Miss Earth India 2019. "Tanvi Kharote" was crowned Miss Divine Beauty 2020 (held virtually).

The reigning Miss Earth India 2021 is Rashmi Madhuri. She was crowned as Miss Divine Beauty 2021 (held at Welcom Hotel, New Delhi).

Titleholders

Miss Earth representatives

Color key

Gallery

Notes
2021 - The reigning Miss Earth India 2020 is Rashmi Madhuri. She was Crowned at National Beauty pageant Miss Divine Beauty 2021.
2019 - Tejaswini Manogna as Miss Earth India 2019 was Crowned at National Beauty pageant Miss Divine Beauty 2019.
2018 - Devika Vaid was crowned as Miss Earth India 2018 by Glamanand Supermodel India Organization. Nishi Bhardwaj was sent as a replacement to the original title holder of Miss Earth India 2018 Devika Vaid for the pageant. The original winner suffered with an injury making her unable to compete at the forthcoming Miss Earth 2018.
2017 - No national pageant was held in the year 2017. Shaan Suhas kumar, Miss Earth India Air 2016 was appointed as Miss Earth India 2017 by the national director Cheryl Hansen.

References

External links
Miss Divine Beauty

 
India
Beauty pageants in India
2015 establishments in India
Indian awards